Olcott may refer to:

Places
Olcott, Bell County, Kentucky
Olcott, New York
Olcott, West Virginia
 Olcott (crater), a relatively fresh crater on the far side of the Moon

Other uses
Olcott (surname)
Henry Steel Olcott
Justice Olcott (disambiguation)